Saint-Géry Island or Sint-Goriks Island was the largest island in the river Senne in Brussels, Belgium. It was named after Saint Gaugericus of Cambrai, who according to legend, built a chapel there around 580. It ceased to exist as an island when the Senne was covered over in the late 19th century, and a former covered market; the /, was built in its centre. Since the late 20th century, this building has been rehabilitated as an exhibition space.

Location and accessibility
Saint-Géry Island's easternmost edge was located more or less due west across today's Boulevard Anspach/Anspachlaan from the Place de la Bourse/Beursplein and the former Brussels Stock Exchange building. The island was roughly round, and was originally centred on the Church of St. Gaugericus, then following the church's demolition in 1798–1802, on the /, a former covered market, which has since become one of Brussels' trendiest districts. 

Many streets and buildings in the area still bear the name /. On a small square between the / and the /, there is also still a dead arm of the Senne, the only part of the river in the city centre that is not vaulted. This neighbourhood is served by the premetro (underground tram) station Bourse/Beurse on lines 3 and 4.

History

Early history
Starting in the 10th century, the church began to house the relics of the martyr Saint Gudula, who had died two centuries earlier, transferred there from Moorsel (located in today's province of East Flanders) by Duke Charles of Lower Lorraine. In 1047, these relics were transferred again by Count Lambert II of Leuven to the church that would later become the Cathedral of St. Michael and St. Gudula.

When King Lothair II appointed the same Charles (his brother) to become Duke of Lower Lotharingia in 977, Charles constructed a fort on the island. Past the island, navigation on the Senne was much more difficult, so it was a good strategic position. It had to defend not only the area, but also the western frontier of the Holy Roman Empire (to which the Duchy of Brabant, and thus also Brussels, belonged) against attacks by the French kings and their powerful vassals, the Counts of Flanders. This fort marked the birth of the City of Brussels, though the ruins have not been found. The island was also said to be once completely carpeted in yellow irises. Due to the island's importance, the iris has been a symbol of Brussels since the 19th century, and a stylised version is featured on the flag of the Brussels-Capital Region.

By the 12th century, the island was home to a high density of watermills, playing an important role in Brussels' growth as a commercial centre. During the Middle Ages, the island also housed a large number of fishmongers, who would use the surrounding river to exchange the water in their fish reservoirs. Fish were extremely important in the Roman Catholic city, as fasts prescribed by the church were rigorously obeyed. This ceased to be common practice even before the Industrial Revolution, as a growing number of tanners, dyers and other trades dumped their waste into the river, causing it to be unsuitable for storing fish.

At the end of the 18th century, under the French revolutionary regime, the Gothic Church of St. Gaugericus (which had replaced the chapel) was razed, replaced by a fountain centred on an obelisk, dating from 1767, which had been taken from Grimbergen Abbey (in present-day Flemish Brabant). The square was an open-air market for the following century.

19th century–present
Around 1870, when the Senne was covered over, the island ceased to exist as an island and some of its eastern sections were demolished to make way for the modern bourgeois housing on the newly constructed Boulevard Anspach/Anspachlaan (then called the /). Plans were made to create a covered market to replace the open-air one, and in 1882, work was completed. The interior, which still includes the old fountain-obelisk, has four rows of double blue stone stalls. The building's metallic structure is an outstanding architectural example of hall design.

The Halles Saint-Géry prospered until after the Second World War, then, abandoned by traders, it was finally closed in 1977. Despite the building's designation in 1987 and several attempts at commercial or cultural reassignment, it took more than twenty years for the halls to benefit from a definitive rehabilitation as an exhibition space. Nowadays, the Saint-Géry area is well known for the many bars, cafés and restaurants in the vicinity, making it a popular nightspot in the capital.

See also

 History of Brussels
 Belgium in "the long nineteenth century"

References

Footnotes

Notes

Bibliography

External links

 Halles Saint Géry official homepage - Events calendar, Photo gallery, and more.
 ASBL Saint Géry - Neighbours and Businesses Association.

Geography of Brussels
History of Brussels
Former islands
City of Brussels